Just Plain Country is a studio album by Kay Starr. It was released in 1962 by Capitol Records (catalog no. T-1795). Ken Nelson was the producer. In 2015, the Universal Music Group made the album available on YouTube.

Upon its release, Billboard magazine gave the album its highest rating of four stars and wrote: "Kay Starr has always been great at songs of the heart and if there was ever any doubt of that, this collection of strong country material proves it. ... It's warm-hearted wax that fans of the material, not to mention those of the artist, will like."

AllMusic later gave the album a rating of two stars. Reviewer Greg Adams noted that the material tended more toward pop than country.

Track listing
Side A
 "Pins And Needles In My Heart" [2:52]
 "Crazy" (Willie Nelson) [2:55]
 "Four Walls" (Marvin J. Moore, George H. Campbell, Jr) [3:10]
 "My Last Date (With You)" [2:47]
 "Blues Stay Away From Me" [2:42]
 "Walk on By" (Kendall Hayes, Gary Walker) [2:14]

Side B
 "Oh Lonesome Me" (Don Gibson) [2:54]
 "I Can't Help It (If I'm Still In Love With You)" [2:54]
 "I Really Don't Want To Know" [4:06]
 "Singing The Blues" (Melvin Endsley) [2:23]
 "Do Not Worry" [2:43]

References

1962 albums
Kay Starr albums
Capitol Records albums